The Slama Carol or Slama Kali (literally "Play of peace") is a Syrian Christian traditional musical artform that originated in the coastal areas of Alappuzha and Cochin in Kerala, India.

Etymology
Slama means peace in Aramaic language. Kali means a play or drama.

Theme
The resurrection of Jesus is the central theme of this artform. It uses colourful costumes for Characters of such as Jesus, Apostles, Virgin Mary, etc. In this musical dance, happiness is the predominant emotion.

References

Christian folklore
Culture of Kerala
Arts of Kerala